Eduard "Edi" Kirschner (born 9 September 1953) is a German former professional footballer who played as a striker. Active in both Germany and North America between 1975 and 1985, Kirschner made over 250 career league appearances, scoring over 100 goals.

Career
Kirschner played in Germany for FC Passau, Bayern Munich, SpVgg Fürth, FC Augsburg and Fortuna Köln, and in the North American Soccer League for the Edmonton Drillers and the Fort Lauderdale Strikers.

In the 1978–79 season of the 2. Bundesliga Süd Kirschner was the top-scorer with 33 goals.

References

External links
 NASL career stats
 

Living people
1953 births
German footballers
Association football forwards
FC Bayern Munich footballers
FC Bayern Munich II players
FC Augsburg players
SC Fortuna Köln players
Bundesliga players
2. Bundesliga players
Edmonton Drillers (1979–1982) players
Fort Lauderdale Strikers (1977–1983) players
North American Soccer League (1968–1984) players
German expatriate footballers
German expatriate sportspeople in Canada
Expatriate soccer players in Canada
German expatriate sportspeople in the United States
Expatriate soccer players in the United States
SK Schärding players